White Stone may refer to:
 White Stone (ski store), a British sports retailer
 White Stone, South Carolina, an unincorporated community in Spartanburg County
 White Stone, Virginia, a town in Lancaster County
 White Stone Lake, a lake in Chisago County, Minnesota

See also 
 Whitestone (disambiguation)
 White Stones, a 1997 album by Secret Garden